Borgonovo may refer to:

 Borgonovo, Switzerland, village, part of the municipality of Bregaglia in the Maloja district of the Swiss canton Graubünden, Switzerland
 Borgonovo, Torricella Sicura, frazione in the Province of Teramo in the Abruzzo region of Italy
 Borgonovo Val Tidone, municipality in the Province of Piacenza in the Italian region Emilia-Romagna

People 

 
 
 
 
 Stefano Borgonovo

See also 

 Borgo Nuovo